Buffalo Run is a  long 3rd order tributary to Sewickley Creek in Westmoreland County, Pennsylvania.

Course
Buffalo Run rises at West Bethany, Pennsylvania, and then flows north-northwest to join Sewickley Creek at Hunker.

Watershed
Buffalo Run drains  of area, receives about 41.5 in/year of precipitation, has a wetness index of 369.10, and is about 48% forested.

References

 
Tributaries of the Ohio River
Rivers of Pennsylvania
Rivers of Westmoreland County, Pennsylvania
Allegheny Plateau